Ricinula is a genus of predatory sea snails, marinegastropod mollusks in the family Muricidae, the murex snails or rock snails.

Ricinula has become a synonym of  Drupa Röding, 1798

Species
Species within the genus Ricinula include:
 Ricinula hystrix (Lamarck, 1822)
 Ricinula nodus Lamarck, 1816

References

 Nomenclator Zoologicus info

Rapaninae